PIAS or Pias may refer to:

 PIAS Group, a Belgian music company
 PIAS Recordings (Play It Again Sam), an independent record label based in Brussels and owned by the PIAS Entertainment Group
 PIAS Group, a Japanese cosmetic company
 Protein inhibitor of activated STAT, a regulator of cytokine signaling
 Philadelphia International Auto Show, an annual auto show held in the city of Philadelphia, Pennsylvania

Places
Pias (Cinfães), Portugal
Pias (Ferreira do Zêzere), Portugal
Pias (Lousada), Portugal
Pias (Monção), Portugal
Pias (Serpa), Portugal

See also

 Pia (disambiguation), for the singular
 Play it again, Sam (disambiguation)